Alfred Philpott (15 December 1870 – 24 July 1930) was a New Zealand museum curator, entomologist and writer. He was born in Tysoe, Warwickshire, England, on 15 December 1870. He became the first person to describe Zelleria maculata in 1930.

References

1870 births
1930 deaths
New Zealand writers
New Zealand entomologists
New Zealand curators
English emigrants to New Zealand
People from Warwickshire
Fellows of the Royal Society of New Zealand